Makhoma is a settlement in Kenya's Busia County. The approximate population of 7 km radius from this point is 37720.

References 

Populated places in Western Province (Kenya)
Busia County